The 2011 NCAA Division I Women's Lacrosse Championship was the 30th annual single-elimination tournament to determine the national champion of Division I NCAA women's college lacrosse. The first two rounds of the tournament were played at the home fields of higher-seeded teams from May 14–21, and the semifinal and championship rounds were played at Kenneth P. LaValle Stadium in Stony Brook, New York from May 27–29. All NCAA Division I women's lacrosse programs were eligible for this championship, and a total of 16 teams were invited to participate.

Northwestern defeated Maryland, 8–7, to win their sixth national championship, and first since 2009. This would subsequently become the sixth of Northwestern's seven national titles in eight years (2005–2009, 2011–12) as well as the seventh of the Wildcats' eight consecutive appearances in the championship game (2005–12). This was also a rematch of the previous year's final, won by Maryland.

The leading scorer for the tournament was Shannon Smith from Northwestern (22 goals). Smith was also named the tournament's Most Outstanding Player.

Tournament field
A total of 16 teams were invited to participate. 9 teams qualified automatically by winning their conference tournaments while the remaining 7 teams qualified at-large based on their regular season records.

Play-in games

Seeds

1. Maryland (18-1)
2. Northwestern (17-2)
3. North Carolina (13-5)
4. Florida (15-3)
5. Duke (13-4)
6. Loyola (16-2)
7. Albany (17-0)
8. James Madison (15-3)

Teams

Tournament bracket 

* Host institution

All-tournament team 
Emma Hamm, Duke
Mollie Mackler, Duke
Brandi Jones, Maryland
Sarah Mollison, Maryland
Katie Schwarzmann, Maryland
Corey Donohoe, North Carolina
Laura Zimmerman, North Carolina
Erin Fitzgerald, Northwestern
Brianne LoManto, Northwestern
Colleen Magarity, Northwestern
Shannon Smith, Northwestern (Most outstanding player)
Taylor Thornton, Northwestern

See also 
 NCAA Division II Women's Lacrosse Championship 
 NCAA Division III Women's Lacrosse Championship
 2011 NCAA Division I Men's Lacrosse Championship

References

NCAA Division I Women's Lacrosse Championship
NCAA Division I Women's Lacrosse Championship
NCAA Women's Lacrosse Championship